Citi FM is a privately owned radio station in Accra, the capital of Ghana. Omni Media Limited owns and runs the station. The station was adjudged the best English-speaking Radio Station in Ghana, at the 25th Ghana Journalists Associations’ (GJA) Awards ceremony.

Citi Breakfast Show (#CitiCBS) 
The Citi Breakfast Show is Citi FM's flagship morning talk show that airs from 6:15Am to 10Am with Bernard Avle as the host. Bernard and his team have gained public respect in the last decade by exploring, questioning and presenting a morning show that delves into current affairs and matters of importance often overlooked in the excited babble of socio-political news.

The hashtag #CitiCBS has won recognition for its nationally relevant work in promoting Ghanaian business and economy, ending Galamsey, and more. The Citi Breakfast show was adjudged the Best Radio Morning Show of the year (English category) in Ghana in 2019 and 2020.

Awards and recognition 
Radio and Television Personalities Awards Radio Station Of The Year 2019–2020.

Notable presenters 

 AJ Akuoko-Sarpong
 Bernard Avle
 Samuel Attah-Mensah
 Kent Mensah
 Kokui Selormey
 Christopher Opoku
 Nana Ama Agyemang Asante
 Kojo Akoto Boateng
 Sandister Tei
 Jessica Opare-Saforo
 Nana Boakye-Yiadom (journalist)
 Umaru Sanda Amadu
 Richard Dela Sky

References 

Radio stations in Ghana
Greater Accra Region
Mass media in Accra